Events from the year 1846 in Scotland.

Incumbents

Law officers 
 Lord Advocate – Duncan McNeill until July; then Andrew Rutherfurd
 Solicitor General for Scotland – Adam Anderson; then Thomas Maitland

Judiciary 
 Lord President of the Court of Session and Lord Justice General – Lord Boyle
 Lord Justice Clerk – Lord Hope

Events 
 January – African American abolitionist Frederick Douglass arrives in Scotland from Ireland to continue his speaking tour of the United Kingdom. 
 22 June – the North British Railway is opened to public traffic between Edinburgh and Berwick-upon-Tweed, the first line to cross the border between Scotland and England. Edinburgh Waverley railway station is opened.
 15 August – inauguration of Scott Monument in Edinburgh.
 21 December – Scottish-born surgeon Robert Liston carries out the first operation under anesthesia in Europe, at University College Hospital in London.
 Start of Highland Potato Famine.
 English tourism pioneer Thomas Cook brings 350 people from Leicester on a tour of Scotland.
 Lighthouses at Covesea Skerries, Chanonry Point and Cromarty (all designed by Alan Stevenson) first illuminated.
 New College, Edinburgh, opens its doors as a theological training college for the Free Church of Scotland.
 Catherine Murray, Countess of Dunmore, commissions "the Paisley Sisters" of Strond on Harris to weave tweed in the Clan Murray tartan, origin of the commercial Harris Tweed industry.
 Engineer Robert William Thomson is granted his first patent for a pneumatic tyre, in France.
 The Dewar's Scotch whisky brand is created by John Dewar, Sr.
 Charles William George St John's Short Sketches of the Wild Sports and Natural History of the Highlands is published.

Births 
 1 January – Edward Pinnington, art historian, biographer and journalist (died 1921)
 10 February – James Burns, shipowner (died 1923 in Australia)
 28 February – John F. McIntosh, steam locomotive engineer (died 1918)
 21 June – Marion Adams-Acton ("Jeanie Hering"), born Marion Jean Hamilton, novelist (died 1928 in London)

Deaths 
 12 February – Henry Duncan, minister, geologist and social reformer (born 1774)
 23 May – Charles Ewart, soldier (born 1769)
 Andrew Innes, last survivor of the Buchanites

The arts
 William Motherwell's Poetical Works are published posthumously.
 Carolina, Lady Nairne's Lays from Strathern are published posthumously, revealing her authorship. This includes the Jacobite song "The Hundred Pipers".

See also 

 Timeline of Scottish history
 1846 in the United Kingdom

References 

 
 Scotland
1840s in Scotland